Elections to Liverpool City Council were held on 1 November 1934. One third of the council seats were up for election, the term of office of each councillor being three years.

Eight of the forty seats up for election were uncontested.

After the election, the composition of the council was:

Election result

Ward results

* - Councillor seeking re-election

Comparisons are made with the 1931 election results.

Abercromby

Aigburth

Allerton

Anfield

Breckfield

Brunswick

Castle Street

Childwall

Croxteth

Dingle

Edge Hill

Everton

Exchange

Fairfield

Fazakerley

Garston

Granby

Great George

Kensington

Kirkdale

Little Woolton

Low Hill

Much Woolton

Netherfield

North Scotland

Old Swan

Prince's Park

Sandhills

St. Anne's

St. Domingo

St. Peter's

Sefton Park East

Sefton Park West

South Scotland

Vauxhall

Walton

Warbreck

Wavertree

Wavertree West

West Derby

Aldermanic Elections

Aldermanic Election 6 February 1935

Following the death on 8 January 1935 of Alderman Wilfred Bowring Stoddart (Conservative, elected as an alderman possibly following the death on 29 October 1932 of Alderman Joseph Dalton Flood. In his place, Councillor Alfred Gates JP (Liberal, elected for Anfield on 1 November 1932) of 15 Childwall Priory Road, Liverpool, was elected as an alderman on 6 February 1935.

The term of office to expire on 9 November 1938.

Aldermanic Election 6 March 1935

Following the death on 23 January 1935 of Alderman John Clancy 
(Labour, last elected as an alderman on 9 November 1929), Councillor James Bennett O.B.E. (Conservative, elected to the Castle Street ward at a by election on 29 November 1932 ), Managing Director of Red Rocks, Stanley Road, Hoylake, was elected as an alderman on 6 March 1935.

The term of office to expire on 9 November 1935.

By-elections

No. 1 Sandhills, 29 November 1934

Caused by the death of Councillor James William Joseph Baker (Labour, elected for the Sandhills ward on 1 November 1932)

No. 19 Kensington, 26 February 1935

Caused by the resignation of Councillor John Moores (Conservative, elected to the Kensington ward on 1 November 1933).

No. 5 Exchange, 28 February 1935

Caused by the death on 20 December 1934 of Councillor Miss Alice McCormick (Centre, elected 1 November 1932).

No. 29 Anfield, 26 March 1935

Following the death on 8 January 1935 of Alderman Wilfred Bowring Stoddart (Conservative, elected as an alderman possibly following the death on 29 October 1932 of Alderman Joseph Dalton Flood. In his place, Councillor Alfred Gates JP (Liberal, elected for Anfield on 1 November 1932) of 15 Childwall Priory Road, Liverpool, was elected as an alderman on 6 February 1935.

No. 7 Castle Street 

Following the death on 23 January 1935 of Alderman John Clancy (Labour, last elected as an alderman on 9 November 1929), Councillor James Bennett O.B.E. (Conservative, elected to the Castle Street ward at a by election on 29 November 1932 ) was elected as an alderman on 6 March 1935.

See also

 Liverpool City Council
 Liverpool Town Council elections 1835 - 1879
 Liverpool City Council elections 1880–present
 Mayors and Lord Mayors of Liverpool 1207 to present
 History of local government in England

References

1934
1934 English local elections
1930s in Liverpool